Albcontrol is a 100% joint stock Albanian company owned by the  Ministry of Infrastructure and Energy (Albania). It was established as a state-owned enterprise in 1992 and on February 3, 1999 it transformed into a joint stock company called the "National Air Traffic Agency". Albcontrol manages and controls the Albanian airspace (FIR), in compliance with international air navigation standards.
It is a member of Eurocontrol since 2003. In 2009 it joined CANSO Global and in January 2016 it became a full member of CANSO Europe Region.

See also
 Civil Aviation Authority (Albania)

References

1992 establishments in Albania
Transport companies of Albania